is a 2013 Japanese science fiction drama film directed by Kiyoshi Kurosawa, starring Takeru Satoh and Haruka Ayase. It is Kurosawa's first feature film since Tokyo Sonata (2008). It is based on Rokuro Inui's novel A Perfect Day for Plesiosaur. It was released in Japan on 1 June 2013.

Plot
Suffering from writer's block, a manga artist Atsumi (Haruka Ayase) has attempted suicide and is in a coma. Koichi (Takeru Satoh), Atsumi's lover, tries to awaken her. With help from doctors Aihara (Miki Nakatani) and Yonemura (Keisuke Horibe), Koichi enters the mind of Atsumi by using the experimental technology called "sensing".

Cast
 Takeru Satoh as Koichi Fujita
 Haruka Ayase as Atsumi Kazu
 Miki Nakatani as Eiko Aihara
 Joe Odagiri as Sawano
 Shota Sometani as Shingo Takagi
 Keisuke Horibe as Yonemura
 Yutaka Matsushige as Haruhiko
 Kyōko Koizumi as Makiko

Release
The film was released in Japan on 1 June 2013. It also screened at the 2013 Locarno Festival, the 2013 Toronto International Film Festival, and the 2013 New York Film Festival.

Reception
On review aggregator website Rotten Tomatoes, the film holds an approval rating of 57%, with an average rating of 5.85/10, based on 7 reviews.

Eric Kohn of IndieWire gave the film a B− grade, saying: "While the two main leads share enough chemistry to inject their drama with purpose, it's hardly enough to justify the two hour-plus journey." Maggie Lee of Variety had a mixed reaction, describing the films as "Kiyoshi Kurosawa at his least disturbing or mesmerizing," and said: "Although the aesthetics retain the Nipponese horror maestro's trademark haunting quality, the yarn's U-turn from psycho-horror to hokey childlike fable is unexpected and disappointing". Boyd Van Hoeij of The Hollywood Reporter praised the production design by Takeshi Shimizu.

References

External links
 Official website (archive)
 

Films directed by Kiyoshi Kurosawa
2010s science fiction drama films
Japanese science fiction drama films
2013 films
Films about comics
2010s Japanese films
2010s Japanese-language films